Molla Salemi (also Romanized as Mollā Sālemī) is a village in Abdan Rural District, in the Central District of Deyr County, Bushehr Province, Iran. At the 2006 census, its population was 103, in 21 families.

References 

Populated places in Deyr County